Wayne W. Lucier (born December 5, 1979) is a former American football center and guard in the National Football League for the New York Giants from 2003 to 2005.  Lucier was cut by the Green Bay Packers on August 16, 2006. Lucier played college football at the University of Colorado at Boulder and was drafted in the seventh round of the 2003 NFL Draft.

References

1979 births
Living people
American football centers
American football offensive guards
Colorado Buffaloes football players
New York Giants players
People from Amesbury, Massachusetts
Players of American football from Massachusetts
Sportspeople from Essex County, Massachusetts